Dentistyla is a genus of sea snails, marine gastropod mollusks in the family Chilodontaidae.

Species
Species within the genus Dentistyla include:
 Dentistyla asperrima (Dall, 1881)
 Dentistyla dentifera (Dall, 1889)
 Dentistyla sericifilum (Dall, 1889)

References

External links
  Dall W.H. 1889. Reports on the results of dredging, under the supervision of Alexander Agassiz, in the Gulf of Mexico (1877-78) and in the Caribbean Sea (1879-80), by the U.S. Coast Survey Steamer "Blake", Lieut.-Commander C.D. Sigsbee, U.S.N., and Commander J.R. Bartlett, U.S.N., commanding. XXIX. Report on the Mollusca. Part 2, Gastropoda and Scaphopoda. Bulletin of the Museum of Comparative Zoölogy at Harvard College, 18: 1-492, pls. 10-40

 
Chilodontaidae